Shin Dong-woo (born November 25, 1998) is a South Korean actor. He started his mandatory military service on November 26, 2018 and discharged on July 6, 2020.

Filmography

Television drama

Film

Music video

Awards and nominations

References

External links

1998 births
Living people
South Korean male child actors
South Korean male film actors
South Korean male television actors
21st-century South Korean male actors
Hanlim Multi Art School alumni
People from Daejeon